Llaneros Fútbol Club S.A. is a professional Colombian football team based in Villavicencio, that currently plays in the Categoría Primera B. They play their home games at the Bello Horizonte stadium.

History
Llaneros F.C. was founded on 20 April 2012, after the then Governor of Meta Department Alan Jara and Mayor of Villavicencio Juan Guillermo Zuluaga with the backing of oil company Pacific Rubiales Energy bought the participation rights (ficha) of Categoría Primera B club Academia, based in Bogotá. The General Assembly of Academia approved the sale of the club on 22 March 2012, with DIMAYOR giving its approval on 27 March 2012 and announcing that Llaneros would enter the competition for the second half of the 2012 season. The club played its first game on 22 July 2012, losing to Alianza Petrolera by a 1–0 score at Academia's former home stadium Estadio Compensar in Bogotá.

By 2015, the club went through an economic crisis accentuated by the problems of its main sponsor Pacific Rubiales, which led the owners to consider offers to sell and move the club to another area of the country. However, at the start of 2016 Llaneros signed an alliance with Categoría Primera A club Santa Fe, in which Santa Fe sent several of its young players to Llaneros on loan as well as a coaching staff led by Germán González, while being responsible for the payment of their wages.

Llaneros' best performance in Primera B came in the 2017 season, in which the team managed by Jairo Patiño reached the finals of the Torneo Finalización but were beaten by Leones by a 4–1 aggregate score, missing the chance to play an additional final series for promotion to the top flight.

2021 controversy
On 4 December 2021, the last matchday of the semi-final Group B of the second tournament of the 2021 Primera B season, Llaneros were beaten by Unión Magdalena by a 2–1 score with a couple of goals in quick succession in stoppage time. This result helped Unión Magdalena earn promotion to Categoría Primera A at the expense of Fortaleza, who were clinching promotion despite losing their final match to Bogotá at the same time since Llaneros were leading against Unión Magdalena. However, video footage of Unión Magdalena's winning goal appeared to show the Llaneros players backing off and failing to make an effort to prevent their rivals from scoring. The events sparked outrage both within the country and abroad, with Colombian internationals Juan Cuadrado and Mateus Uribe expressing their displeasure, calling them "a lack of respect" and "an embarrassment for Colombian football", whilst President of Colombia Iván Duque Márquez stated it was a "national disgrace".

In response to the growing backlash, as well as calls from Fortaleza to get the match annulled and Unión Magdalena's promotion reversed, DIMAYOR chairman Fernando Jaramillo ordered the opening of an inquiry on the match events while also requesting the Office of the Attorney General of Colombia to investigate whether any criminal offenses had been committed, but on 7 December 2021, Jaramillo stated that the tournament would not be paused and Unión Magdalena's promotion would not be overturned while due process was completed.

On 30 December 2021 DIMAYOR's Disciplinary Commission closed the investigation on Unión Magdalena as it found no evidence implying that members of the aforementioned club had been responsible for the events that occurred in the match, but sources within the governing body of Colombian professional football stated that the investigation on Llaneros would remain open. Five months later, it was announced that four Llaneros players who were involved in that match had been fined and suspended from all sporting and administrative activities for "committing acts against sporting dignity and decorum".

Stadium

Current squad

Managers
  Alberto Rujana (2012–13)
  Hubert Bodhert (2014–15)
 Nelson Gómez (2015)
 Víctor González Scott (2015)
 Rubén Molina (2015)
 Germán González (2016)
 Jairo Patiño (2017–18)
 Nelson Gómez (2018–19)
 Jhon Alfredo Ramírez (2019)
 David Suárez (2020)
 Wilmer Sandoval (2020–21)
 Walter Aristizábal (2021–22)
 Jersson González (2022– )

External links
 Official Site

References

 
Association football clubs established in 2012
Football clubs in Colombia
Categoría Primera B clubs